Archbishop Quigley Preparatory Seminary was an American seminary preparatory school administered by the Roman Catholic Archdiocese of Chicago for young men considering the priesthood. Located in downtown Chicago at 103 East Chestnut Street, adjacent to Loyola University Chicago's Water Tower campus, it closed on 22 June 2007, and became the Archbishop Quigley Center, the pastoral center and headquarters of the archdiocese after renovations ending 19 November 2008. Between 1961 and 1990, the seminary was split into two campuses: Quigley South and Quigley North, with Quigley North housed at the original building. The south campus was closed in 1990, with all seminary operations returning to the original building.

The predecessor of the school, Cathedral College of the Sacred Heart, was founded in 1905. Cardinal George Mundelein announced plans in 1916 for the building of a preparatory seminary at Rush and Chestnut Streets in downtown Chicago, and named the school in honor of his predecessor, Archbishop James Edward Quigley.
Echoing the educational theories of Johann Wolfgang Goethe, Cardinal Mundelein surrounded Quigley students with great architectural beauty:

"This will unquestionably be the most beautiful building here in Chicago, not excluding the various buildings of the University of Chicago."

Quigley's Chapel of St. James, with stained glass modeled after Sainte-Chapelle in Paris, was dedicated upon the seventy-fifth anniversary of the Archdiocese of Chicago and the twenty-fifth anniversary of Mundelein's priestly ordination on 10 June 1920. Designed by architect Zachary Taylor Davis, with stained glass by Robert Giles of the John J. Kinsella Company of Chicago, it has been listed on the National Register of Historic Places since 1996. The American Institute of Architects Guide to Chicago has termed the stained glass of the Quigley Chapel "dazzling."

The Quigley seminaries have educated almost 2,500 priests, two cardinals, over forty-one bishops, two Vatican II periti, separate recipients of the Medal of Honor and the Presidential Medal of Freedom, the Order of Merit of the Republic of Poland, and, in sports, two members of the Basketball Hall of Fame.

Early history
Archbishop James E. Quigley began plans for a minor seminary in Chicago in July 1903, shortly after his installation. Only 417 diocesan and 149 order priests then served Chicago's 252 parishes, with a city population nearing 1.7 million, and with the archdiocese's then boundaries extending across northern Illinois. Quigley recruited Rev. Francis Andrew Purcell to head the new minor seminary, and dispatched him to the College Propaganda Fide in Rome to earn a doctorate in divinity.

The site of the new seminary at Wabash, then Cass Avenue and Superior Street, was opened on 2 October 1905, upon Purcell's return, and named Cathedral College of the Sacred Heart. Following the European seminary practice of being sited in the midst of the city center of ministry, it also followed the practice of school on Saturday, with Thursday off. No tuition was charged for the first 52 freshmen recruited and admitted upon the nomination of their pastor. Nine other priests, all with either Irish or German surnames, served as the faculty. It became the established tradition of Chicago's minor seminaries that financial want should not prevent a seminarian from attending.

Quigley purchased land on the far West Side of Chicago, in today's Austin neighborhood, for a future major seminary, and a site at Addison Street and Sheridan Road for a larger minor seminary, since Cathedral College had quickly grown to encompass three buildings. Chicago's rapid expansion made the Austin site unsuitable for a major seminary, and Quigley sold the property to the city for its present use as a portion of the beautiful Columbus Park, later designed by the noted landscape architect Jens Jensen. Quigley's health failed before he could put his plan of seminary development in motion, but at an ecclesiastical event in the Eastern United States prior to his death, Quigley providentially spent an afternoon with George Mundelein, then auxiliary bishop of Brooklyn, describing his plans in detail. Quigley died on 10 July 1915, but his successor Mundelein expanded upon Quigley's vision and put it into action. Upon his being named Archbishop, Mundelein boarded a train on 7 February 1916, with a delegation from his new archdiocese, and headed to Chicago, where he was installed as archbishop two days later.

Within a few weeks, on "the feast of the Holy Apostles Phillip and James, 1916", Mundelein wrote to the priests of Chicago:

"It is for this reason that in several of the dioceses of the country, the bishops have established the more modern form of the preparatory seminary, where the young boy selected from among his companions by the pastor or confessor, who discerns in him the probable signs of a vocation, the piety, application and intelligence which is required for the candidate for the holy priesthood, even while remaining in the sacred circle of the home and under the watchful eye of a pious mother, is placed apart and educated with those who only look forward to that same great work in life, the priestly field of labor, keeping daily before his mind the sublime vocation of the priesthood, preserving him pure and pious by constant exhortation, by daily assistance at the Holy Sacrifice and by frequent reception of the sacraments."

"The buildings are to be in the early French Gothic style of architecture and by reason of the distinct individuality and prominent location, will form a place of interest, not only to visitors, but to all lovers of the City Beautiful. The group will be composed of a main college building, and two ornate wings will be one the chapel, the other the library and gymnasium."

Earlier in 1916, Mundelein had purchased a half block of land on Rush Street from Pearson to Chestnut Streets, and later sold the Addison and Sheridan property for $600,000, with a profit of $160,000, in April 1917, with the profit going to build the new Quigley Seminary, and the principal being reserved for the planned new major seminary. With the ground broken in November 1916 and a cornerstone laid at the corner of Pearson and Rush on 16 September 1917, classes were first held at school's current location in September 1918.

Carrying on a precedent established in 1905 in Cathedral College under rector Rev. Francis Andrew "Doc" Purcell (Msgr. in 1922), also Quigley Seminary's first rector, the new "Quigley Memorial Preparatory Seminary" was established with a five-year program of study (which continued until 1961), but like Cathedral College as a day school, so that Quigley students "would never lose contact with their heritage, their families, their Church."

"By 1922, Quigley Seminary was already overcrowded, with over 600 students in a building designed to hold 500. A west wing of the building, this time in the Flemish-Gothic style, was begun in March 1925 and completed amazingly by December 1925, increasing the capacity of the school another 500."

Msgr. Purcell established the school newspaper, The Candle, its yearbook, Le Petit Seminaire, the Cathedral Choristers (a boys' choir which sang at Sunday Masses at Holy Name Cathedral), catechists (who served at parishes), the Beadsmen (who gathered after school and at breaks to pray the Rosary), and the primacy of basketball among Quigley Seminary's intramural and interscholastic sports. By the end of his tenure as rector in 1931, Quigley faculty had grown from ten at Cathedral College in 1905 to forty-two, and the student body had grown from fifty-two in 1905 to 1,030. Quigley's priest faculty were expected to live in the parishes of the Archdiocese, so as to keep a parish and priestly connection.

Msgr. Purcell was succeeded as rector in 1931 by Msgr. Philip Francis Mahoney, who according to the Archdiocesan history, changed little established by Purcell, and whose poor health led to his resignation during the 1934–35 academic year. Mundelein then met with the Quigley faculty and asked for their prayerful individual and confidential recommendations for the rector's position. During the next faculty meeting, Cardinal Mundelein named as Quigley's third rector the faculty choice, Rev. Malachy P. Foley. Msgr. Foley urged Quigley faculty to earn graduate degrees, regularly met personally with students both to praise and correct, expected classroom professionalism, and, according to Archdiocesan historian Msgr. Harry Koenig's account, "maintained Quigley as a seminary that saw itself as second to no other high school."

Mundelein's "Paperhanger" Speech and His Impact on Quigley
Perhaps the most memorable event in Quigley Seminary's history came on Tuesday, 18 May 1937, when Cardinal Mundelein, speaking to 500 priests at Quigley during a quarterly diocesan conference, lashed out at Nazi leaders Adolf Hitler, Joseph Goebbels, and Hermann Göring for using the pretext of "immorality" and sexual scandals to attack Catholic religious orders, organizations, and German Catholic schools, which at the time educated two million children, saying:

The fight is to take the children away from us. If we show no interest in this matter now, if we shrug our shoulders and mutter, 'Maybe there is some truth in it, or maybe it is not our fight;' if we don't back up our Holy Father (Pope Pius XI) when we have a chance, well when our turn comes we, too, will be fighting alone. . . . Perhaps you will ask how it is that a nation of sixty million people, intelligent people, will submit in fear to an alien, an Austrian paperhanger, and a poor one at that I am told, and a few associates like Goebbels and Göring who dictate every move of the people's lives...

Nazi minister Goebbels, labeled a "crooked minister of propaganda" in the same speech by Mundelein, responded furiously within days at a mass rally with 18,000 attendants, demanding that the Vatican discipline Mundelein, which it refused to do. Nazi attacks on German Catholic institutions intensified, and 200 Catholic newspapers were shut down. In Philadelphia, the International Brotherhood of Painters, Paperhangers, and Decorators for their part took exception to the Cardinal's classification of Hitler as a "paperhanger" in any case, despite Mundelein's remarks "he was not a very good one."

Mundelein similarly championed Quigley, and personally recruited Catholic families to send their sons into the priesthood, including Frederick and Reynold Henry Hillenbrand, sons of the dentist who treated Mundelein's niece, and later treated Mundelein himself. In a 2 January 1938 speech to 2,000 members of the Holy Name Society at Holy Name Cathedral, Chicago, Mundelein said:

Our place is beside the poor, behind the working man. They are our people; they build our churches, they occupy our pews, their children crowd our schools, our priests come from their sons. They look to us for leadership, but they look to us, too, for support.

Chicago's poor and working people comprised many immigrant groups, and Mundelein used his seminaries to break down ethnic barriers among the clergy. Ethnic groups fought back, and demanded concessions from Mundelein to preserve their identity. One such concession was that Quigley students of Polish descent had to learn Polish, a practice that continued from Mundelein's day until 1960.

1940s to 1950s
The Quigley-educated rector and faculty member, Msgr. John W. Schmid, followed Msgr. Foley as the fourth rector in 1944, and expanded the language curriculum, sending professors (Quigley faculty were called "professors" or "profs" for short) to study in Mexico, Canada, and Europe, and added sciences and physical education as requirements. Schmid, seeing the student body of Quigley growing to 1,300
near the end of his thirty-one years of service to Quigley as professor and rector in 1955, began a formal study for expansion of the school, and stepped aside so a younger man could lead it. The vigorous and athletic Msgr. Martin M. Howard, another Quigley graduate and professor, fluent in classical languages and Spanish, was named rector on 18 May 1955, by Cardinal Samuel Stritch.

According to Msgr. Koenig's account, Msgr. Howard faced the task of fitting four years of high school and two years of college into Quigley's five-year curriculum with a "Sulpician language-school model" of seminary inherited from Msgr. Purcell a half-century previous. With frequent faculty consultation, Howard participated in plans with Cardinal Stritch to convert Quigley to a four-year program, build a second Quigley near Chicago's south suburbs, establish a four-year free-standing college seminary, and shorten the program at St. Mary of the Lake Seminary in Mundelein, Illinois, to four years of graduate study. In the meantime, the Archdiocese rented the Ogden School at 39 West Chestnut from the Chicago Board of Education as Quigley's "Annex" to better accommodate the overflow of Quigley's 1,300 students.

Late 1950s to 1970s
Before Cardinal Stritch could complete the plan for the second Quigley, he died in Rome on 27 May 1958. At the direction of his successor, Cardinal Albert Gregory Meyer, a former seminary rector and Milwaukee archbishop named archbishop of Chicago on 19 September 1958, the seminary built a new high school, Quigley Preparatory Seminary South, at 77th Street and Western Avenue, which opened in 1961, with Msgr. Howard named as its first rector. The original Quigley classes of 1960 and 1961 graduated in Spring, 1961, with the new Chicago college seminary, later to be called Niles College, opening that Fall.

Cardinal Meyer dedicated the Quigley South Chapel of the Sacred Heart (so named to hearken to the original Chicago minor seminary, Cathedral College of the Sacred Heart), its  campus, and new facilities for its 869 students on 13 September 1962. For a short period in the early 1960s, both Quigley campuses held joint events, including graduations, in order to instill among the students the spirit of sharing one school.

Msgr. John P. O'Donnell (Q' 41) was named rector of the newly named Quigley Preparatory Seminary North at the original Chestnut Street location in 1961. Msgr. O'Donnell encouraged his faculty to seek degrees from many universities, and he himself earned a PhD from Loyola University and a master's degree from the University of Notre Dame, in addition to earlier master's and licentiate degrees from St. Mary of the Lake Seminary. Cardinal Meyer continued the practice of appointing priests to Quigley on the theory that "young seminarians needed a good number of priest-models to make an intelligent decision about their vocations." In 1965, Msgr. O'Donnell also led Quigley North in earning accreditation from the North Central Association of Colleges and Schools and took steps to make Advanced Placement classes available for students, an action mirrored at Quigley South, the year that Archbishop John Patrick Cody was named to succeed Cardinal Meyer, who had succumbed to cancer on 9 April. Quigley North faced for the first time a problem of declining enrollment, seeing its freshman class decline from 256 in 1962 to 130 in 1967. Declining enrollments brought both Quigley seminaries to consider further changes.

In 1966, Cardinal Cody instituted a Chicago seminary system-wide change abolishing the Thursday day off and Saturday school day, which had for decades separated Chicago seminarians and seminary faculty from participating in Saturday social activities, while Quigley faculty voted to alter their own dress code requiring a cassock, in place of other clerical attire.  Seminary policies prohibiting seminarian participation in co-educational activities and organizations were also revised in that same year. In 1968, dress codes for both Quigley seminaries requiring a suit coat and tie for students were revised to fit the seasons of the year, and the Quigley seminaries made the necessary arrangements so that Quigley students could join the National Honor Society. After a year-long self-study of the entire Chicago archdiocesan seminary system in 1969, assisted by the Arthur D. Little Company of Boston, Cardinal Cody announced in 1970 a new admissions policy for the Quigley seminaries, which expanded beyond Cardinal Mundelein's original requirement in 1916 that Quigley students be "educated with those who only look forward to that same great work in life, the priestly field of labor." Boys from two categories would, as of 1971, be admitted to Quigley, "(a.) ... who have indicated a desire for the priesthood and who meet the requirements of admissions, and (b.) ... who, in the judgment of parish priests, have the kind of character, ability, and temperament which might lead to the personal discovery of a vocation in the priesthood." The new policy also indicated that Quigley North and South should "emphasize the fact that they are contemporary seminaries primarily concerned with the development and encouragement of vocations to the priesthood", and that "a vigorous campaign should be begun, especially on the part of priests, to enroll qualified students."

John Paul II's 1979 Address to Chicago Seminarians at Quigley South
On 5 October 1979, Pope John Paul II visited Quigley South, giving three speeches—one to the bishops of the United States, one to the sick, and one to the minor seminarians of both Quigley schools, to whom he said:

Dear seminarians,I extend a special greeting to all of you who are present here today. I want you to know that you have a special place in my thoughts and prayers.
Dear sons in Christ: Be strong in your faith--faith in Christ and His Church, faith in all that the Father has revealed and accomplished through His Son and the Holy Spirit.
During your years in the minor seminary, you have the privilege of studying and deepening your understanding of the faith. Since Baptism you have lived the faith, aided by your parents, your brothers and sisters, and the whole Christian community. And yet today I call upon you to live by faith even more profoundly. For it is faith in God which makes the essential difference in your lives and in the life of every priest.
Be faithful in your daily prayers; they will keep your faith alive and vibrant.
Study the faith diligently so that your knowledge of Christ will continually increase.
And nourish your faith each day at Mass, for in the Eucharist you have the source and greatest expression of our faith.
God bless you. Quigley: One Hundred Years of Memories, 1905–2005, Taylor Publishing, Dallas, 2006, pg. 41 Pictures of John Paul II at Quigley South, 10/5/1979, Quigley Seminary website, accessed 1/26/2007John Paul II added, "See how important you are--The Pope comes to visit you!"

1981–1987 Vianney Hall Experiment

To appeal to suburban enrollment, Quigley North, under the leadership of then Rector Rev. Donald Cusack, established in 1981 an off-campus residence hall called St. John Vianney Hall on the grounds of Angel Guardian Orphanage (AGO) at 2001 West Devon in Chicago's Rogers Park neighborhood. This site sequestered one building in the AGO complex to house and board students from the hinterland of Chicago, Monday through Fridays, during the academic school calendar. All four Quigley classes were represented in these six years. The Vianney priest faculty included Frs. Barnum and Devereaux, who lived at Vianney full-time. Laymen, typically Loyola University students, were offered room and board in exchange for limited duties of moderating the daily activities of residence life, provide curfew enforcement and supervision of the hall members. The suburbs and exurbs were represented: Maywood, Gurnee, Hoffman Estates, Hillside, Olympia Fields, Buffalo Grove, Waukegan, Oak Park, River Grove, Park Ridge and Skokie. From 1981 to 1985, one hall member even came all the way from Bristol, Wisconsin, attending all 4 years at Quigley North while residing at Vianney Hall. The dorm life was regimented by the priests, providing a general wake up call at 6:30 AM, Chapel service at 7 AM, followed by breakfast, hot or cold, prepared by a cook. Classes began at 8:45 AM. The CTA was the student's "green and cream limousine." The 155 Devon, 151 Sheridan 147 Express and L trains sped the students to Michigan Avenue and Chestnut. Curfew for returning to the hall was 5:30 PM for dinner. Study hours were 6-8 PM, followed by an evening Chapel service, then free time until "lights out" at 10-10:30 PM. A public phone was supplied. Chapel service was a reading of the day's Scriptures and minutes of silent contemplation. An amenity at AGO was a pristine full basketball court (once used by the Chicago Bulls prior to Michael Jordan's arrival) which was perfect for recreation and exercise after a full day's scholastic endeavor. Underclass students were 2 to a room and the Upperclass students were given single rooms. Only one student, Jeff Calabrese of Gurnee, was to have completed all 4 years of education while living at Vianney Hall from the Fall of 1982-Spring of 1986.

The residence life included a compulsory chore night: Thursday evening. Laundry, showers and lavatory, kitchen, and recreation areas, etc., were cleaned and repaired from the week's use. The residence opportunity facilitated a true '"'college prep" atmosphere. Students, as young as 14, were encouraged to care for one's self with limited supervision. To live in the city's North side, travel its Gold Coast, be schooled in a castle feet from the Mag Mile without daily parental imperatives was an accelerated track to young adulthood, save a Vocation's consideration. However, due to financial strains coupled to limited Niles College of Loyola enrollment from the roster of Vianney Hall, the experiment was abandoned. The opportunity for residence life was eliminated in 1987.

Some students chose to live in nearby parishes or commit to the lengthy commute. In all, some 20-30 youth spent a portion of their QN careers as residence of Vianney. Remarkably, this annex of QN was barely recognized by the student body as a whole or by faculty. Its mention, existence and mission were somewhat "conspicuous by absence." The progressive creation of a dormitory system to augment vocations was vanguard, and Quigley's only departure from the day-school model established by Cardinal Mundelein. When Jeff Calabrese mentions that he "lived at high school", he still conjures up New England wealthy and upper middle class institutions' sole ability to afford this option: live at school. Yet humble Quigley North took courage of its conviction and supplied the avenue for this unique and counter-cultural stance to house its students.

1980s to 2007
While in 1983, Quigley North Rector Rev. Thomas Franzman could report that "45% of our seniors headed on to Niles College [Seminary]," by December 1989, facing declining enrollment and a reduction in the number of Quigley graduates completing studies for the priesthood, the Archdiocese announced the closure of both Quigley North and Quigley South as of June 1990, combining both schools into Archbishop Quigley Seminary at the original downtown site for the 1990 Fall term. For several weeks in early 1990, Quigley students and alumni from both institutions picketed the mansion of Cardinal Joseph Bernardin and published a full-page ad in the Chicago Sun-Times, but many of the protesters later joined in supporting the combined Archbishop Quigley Seminary. The Quigley South campus was purchased for the new location of St. Rita High School (originally located at 63rd Street and Claremont Avenue). The reorganized Archbishop Quigley Preparatory Seminary would go on to earn national recognition from U.S. News & World Report in 1999 as one of 96 outstanding high schools in America.

During the period 1984–1993, Quigley graduated an average of 5.5 students per year who completed the remaining eight years leading to ordination. As of the Fall of 2006, with an enrollment of 183 students, Quigley was the largest of the seven remaining preparatory seminaries in the country.

Daily attendance at Mass was required of Quigley students for the greater part of the 20th century, following Cardinal Mundelein's letter of 1916 and John Paul II's 1979 direction quoted above, but the practice declined during the early 90s, when a weekly Mass was instituted. However, when Rev. Peter Snieg was appointed rector in 2001, per Cardinal George's decision, prayer was the centerpiece of Quigley once again. Since academic school year of 2000–01, Mass had been an integral part of spiritual growth, being required three days a week with Monday morning prayer and Friday afternoon prayer to begin and end each week.

The Archdiocese announced on 19 September 2006 that Quigley's doors would be shut at the end of the school year in June 2007.
After one year of renovation the site was to become home to the new archdiocesan Pastoral Center, containing the offices of the archbishop's curia and relative church bodies, with a "Quigley Scholars" program being established to support priestly vocations among high school boys.

On 15 June 2007, (the feast of the Sacred Heart of Jesus) Quigley closed its door to students at the end of the 2007 academic year.

Culture and Traditions

 Beadle—during the Days of the Giants, the student in a Latin classroom designated by the professor to exact discipline and to pass back graded papers, usually the student with the second highest grades in a marking period, but sometimes a student creatively chosen by the professor to motivate the student or the class.
 Beadsmen—an organization of Quigley students who prayed the Rosary in the chapel together and did service projects. Quigley students up until the 1970s were required to pray the Rosary daily.
 Big Brother Little Brother Program- For a period of time, Quigley would pair a member of the senior class with an incoming freshman in order for them to become familiar with the school.
 Candle—the Quigley, and after 1961, the Quigley North student newspaper
 Cards—See "Give me your card." Said to a group of students committing some disciplinary infraction, such as smoking. The prof would hold out his hand, and simply say to the students, "Cards", or "Cards, please", and the offending students would hand over their demerit cards.
 Cathedral Choristers—the boys' choir of Chicago's Holy Name Cathedral populated by Quigley and later Quigley North students during the Days of the Giants. Each entering Bennie was screened at orientation for singing ability, and if he could sing and his voice had not yet changed, his membership in the Cathedral Choristers was mandatory. If his voice had fully changed, he was assigned to the Schola or Glee Club. Founded as the St. George Choral Society in 1918, they became the Cardinal's Cathedral Choristers in 1931. The Choristers recorded "Carols of the Nations", which was a Christmas program performed at the Cathedral and at Quigley until the Choristers were disbanded in 1980.
 Chapel—often referring to daily Mass, morning prayer, and afternoon prayer at Archbishop Quigley.
 Christmas Wreath Toss—During the traditional QN/AQ faculty tree trimming party, usually the first week of Advent, faculty members would take turns in tossing a wreath onto the arm of the statue of John Cardinal Newman in the faculty lounge (aka Tudor Room). If the wreath lands on Cardinal Newman's head or hangs off his finger, the toss is invalid. Often, it will take up to 4-5 rounds before wreath is properly rested on Cardinal Newman's arm.
 The Crow's Nest—located on the 3½ floor northeast staircase of Quigley, the highest office in altitude at 103 E. Chestnut. Fr. William Sheridan long resided in that office. His own name is carved on the wood of the door. The entrance to Memorial Hall is found through this office. During the 1960s this room served as the Le Petite Seminaire yearbook office, and was for a time called "Gilligan's Island" after Rev. John Gilligan, the yearbook moderator.
 Daily Mass—attendance at daily Mass in the early morning hours at one's home parish was required of Quigley students up until the 1970s.
 Days of the Giants—an expression by older Quigley graduates about a past Golden Age in which the school's discipline and performance standards were higher, thus making the students of that era smarter, tougher, holier, better than any given present cohort of students, based upon a Scriptural reference to Genesis 6:4, "At that time the Nephilim (giants) appeared on earth (as well as later), after the sons of heaven had intercourse with the daughters of man, who bore them sons. They were the heroes of old, the men of renown."
 Day off—Traditionally, if the bishop came to visit Quigley for Mass, students could receive the rest of the day off of school, according to his personal prerogative. In latter years of the institution Auxiliary Bishop Jakubowski (an alumnus), particularly, liked to uphold this tradition by announcing at the end of Mass his grant of a "day off" of school (to be given at some later date as determined by the rector.) This practice earned him great affection from students who would, then, beg every other bishop visiting Quigley (including all auxiliaries who might pass through, the cardinal archbishop of Chicago, and visiting prelates from other dioceses) for the same, usually without success. Cardinal George did also eventually offer this privilege to students, at least on one occasion
 Demerit—25 demerits in a semester lead to a student's expulsion, 60 in a year likewise.
 Demerit Card—A card which totes 25 spots, 5 of which lead to a JUG, 25 of which lead to an expulsion. Often referred to in Monopoly terms such as 'Go to Jail' on 25, and Free Parking at 15 (a suspension).
 Lenten Lob—during the season of Lent at Archbishop Quigley, tournaments were held to raise money for the Catholic Missions. Two key events are the Money Jars and the Lob. For the money jars, each class including faculty would have their own jar to collect/add money. At the end of Lent, the class with the most money wins; however, only quarters add to your amount while any other currency deducts from your total. The Lob is when students & faculty have to "lob" balls from different parts of the gymnasium balcony to a bucket on the floor of the gym. Depending on the location and the type of ball used, each class (plus faculty) gains points. At the end of Lent, the points and the money jar are added together to determine the winner.
 Lenten Tournament—an intramural basketball tournament held both at Quigley and at off-site locations, such as the former Chicago Fire Department gymnasium at Navy Pier, during the Days of the Giants.
 Memorial Hall—the east attic where students and faculty sneaked up and signed their names and class year. Earliest records indicates students from the class of 1918 and 1919, all four initials etched in stone. The rest have been signed in chalk with last name and graduation year. Memorial Hall can be accessed through the Crow's Nest.
 Mission Party—a festive after-school event, usually on a Wednesday when Thursday was a free day, with card games, open gym and pool, movies, and refreshments, with funds raised going to benefit the Catholic Missions.
 Mission Walk—The mission walk was to raise money for the Catholic missions, where students walk from Quigley to Mundelein Seminary, a total of approx . Students are to fund raise money for each mile they walk. From the early 1990s to the early 2000s, the mission walk was a two-day event where students departed from Quigley on Friday morning and walk north to Mundelien. It is often tradition for the students who participate to stop by the Cardinal's residence before continuing on. The walk ended in the afternoon on Saturday. It is often tradition that the last mile the participants ran. After 2003, the mission walk was limited to Wrigley Field.
 No girls—Quigley students were forbidden up to the point of expulsion from the seminary to date or to participate in clubs with girls without prior approval until 1966.
 Pastor's signature—during the Days of the Giants, a pastor's letter of recommendation was required for a student to enter Quigley, and pastors as well as parents during the Days of the Giants were required to sign the student's report card at final marking periods. The report card included both grades and demerit totals, so obtaining the pastor's actual signature was a moment of reckoning.
 Schola, or Schola Cantorum—a small group of Quigley students with mature voices trained in Gregorian Chant, who would sing at Quigley or at Holy Name Cathedral during the Days of the Giants.
 Sparks—The official newspaper of Quigley North in its later years. Supposedly stems from an underground newspaper of the 70's called "Sparks from the Candle".
 The Talon—The official student newspaper of Archbishop Quigley from 1990 to the present.
 Thursday off, Saturday on—Quigley students went to school on Saturdays and had Thursday off up until 1966. On Thursdays, Quigley students would often go together to the nearest parish gym, which would sometimes be opened for their exclusive use. Parish priests would often also take Thursdays off, and sometimes join the seminarians in recreation.

Notable alumni

Bishops

 Alfred Leo Abramowicz (Q '37) was an Auxiliary Bishop of Chicago who served as Director of the Catholic League for Religious Assistance to Poland (1960–95). He was the principal US fundraising and organizational contact for the Solidarity movement. He was awarded the Order of Merit of the Republic of Poland.
 Romeo Roy Blanchette (Q '31) was Bishop of Joliet (1966–79).
 Edward K. Braxton (QS '62) is the Bishop of Belleville (2005–present) and former Bishop of Lake Charles (2000–05).
 William E. Cousins (Q '21) served as Archbishop of Milwaukee (1958–71).
 Edward Egan (Q '51) was a Cardinal who served as Bishop of Bridgeport (1988–2000) and Archbishop of New York City (2000–09).
 Thomas Joseph Grady, (Q '32) was the director of the Basilica of the National Shrine of the Immaculate Conception (1956–67) and Bishop of Orlando (1974–89).
 Wilton D. Gregory (QS '65) is the first African American archbishop to be elevated to the rank of Cardinal by Pope Francis on November 28, 2020.  He remains the Archbishop of Washington, DC. (2019–present). Previously, he was  Archbishop of Atlanta (2005–2019). He was the Bishop of Belleville (1994–2004) and president of the United States Conference of Catholic Bishops (2001–04).

 Raymond Peter Hillinger (Q '26) was Bishop of Rockford (1954–56) and auxiliary bishop of Chicago (1956–71).
 Francis J. Kane (Q '61) is an Auxiliary Bishop of Chicago (2003–present).
 John Richard Keating (Q '52) was the Bishop of Arlington (1983–98).
 James Patrick Keleher (Q '51) is the former Archbishop of Kansas City (1993–2005) and Bishop of Belleville (1984–93).
 Gerald Frederick Kicanas (Q '60) is the Bishop of Tucson (2003–present), served as Vice President of the United States Conference of Catholic Bishops (2007–2010), and as Chair of Catholic Relief Services (2010-).
 Jerome Edward Listecki (QS '67) is the Archbishop of Milwaukee (2010–present). He was formerly the Bishop of La Crosse (2004–09).
 Timothy Joseph Lyne (Q '37) was Auxiliary Bishop of Chicago (1983–95).

 John R. Manz (QN '63) is an Auxiliary Bishop of Chicago (1993–present).
 Paul Casimir Marcinkus (Q '40) was an archbishop who served in a number of positions in the Vatican, most notably as head of the Istituto per le Opere di Religione (the "Vatican Bank"; 1971–89).
 John L. May (Q '40) was the Bishop of Mobile (1969–80) and Archbishop of St. Louis (1980–92).
 Thomas J. Murphy (Q '51) was the Bishop of Great Falls-Billings (1978–87) and Archbishop of Seattle (1991–97).
 Cletus F. O'Donnell (Q '35) was Bishop of Madison (1967–92).
 Thomas J. Paprocki (QS '70) is the Bishop of Springfield (2010–present).
 Ernest John Primeau (Q '28) was Bishop of Manchester (1960–74).
 George J. Rassas (Q '61) is an Auxiliary Bishop of Chicago (2005–present).
 Edward James Slattery (Q '59) is the Bishop of Tulsa (1993–present).
 John George Vlazny (Q '55) is the Archbishop of Portland, and former Bishop of Winona (1987–97).
 Aloysius John Wycislo (Q '28) was Bishop of Green Bay (1968–83). During World War II and into the 1950s, he helped to establish refugee camps in the Middle East, India, and Africa, and later worked coordinating aid throughout Eastern and Western Europe.
Michael Fors Olson (QN '84) is the Bishop of Fort Worth (2014–present).
George J. Rassas (Q '61) is an Auxiliary Bishop of Chicago (2005–present).

Other Clergy

 Daniel Coughlin (Q '53) is the former Chaplain of the United States House of Representatives (2000–2011); the first Roman Catholic to hold that position.
 Monsignor John Joseph "Jack" Egan (Q '37) was an author and social and civil rights activist who marched with Rev. Dr. Martin Luther King, Jr. De Paul University's Egan Urban Center is named for him.
 Rev. Andrew M. Greeley (Q '47) was an author, journalist, and sociologist perhaps best known as a columnist for the Chicago Sun-Times.

 Monsignor George G. Higgins, (Q '34) was an author and civil rights activist. In 2000 he received both the Pacem in Terris Award and the Presidential Medal of Freedom.
 Monsignor Reynold Henry Hillenbrand (Q '24) was a Quigley professor and leader in the Liturgical Movement. As rector of University of St. Mary of the Lake from 1936 to 1944, he served as mentor to several activist priests called "Hilly's Men", also mentor to "Specialized Catholic Action" and social action movements.
 Mitch Pacwa SJ (QN '67) is a scripture scholar and EWTN television and radio host.
 Michael Pfleger (QS '67) is a pastor and civil rights activist.

Secular
 Edward M. Burke (Q '61) is a Chicago alderman; the longest continuously serving alderman in the history of the Chicago City Council.
 Michael Edward Harper (QS '76) is a former NBA center-forward with the Portland Trail Blazers (1980–82).
 John Jordan (Q '29) was the men's basketball coach at the University of Notre Dame (1951–64).
 James F. Keane was an Illinois state representative and educator
 John H. Leims was a U.S. Marine awarded the Medal of Honor for service during the Battle of Iwo Jima (attended Quigley, later graduated from St. George High School in Evanston, Illinois).
 Harry Lennix (QS '83) is a television and film actor.
 Michael McCaskey was the former chairman of the Chicago Bears (attended Quigley, later graduated from Notre Dame College Prep in Niles).
 Ray Meyer was the head men's basketball coach at DePaul University (1942–84). He was inducted into the Basketball Hall of Fame in 1979 (attended, and later graduated from St. Patrick High School).
 George Mikan (Q' 41) was a Hall of Fame basketball player (1946–56), best known for his time with the Minneapolis Lakers. He was named the greatest player of basketball's first 50 years, and one of the 50 Greatest Players in NBA History.
 Antonio Munoz (QS '82) is an Illinois State Senator (1999–present).
 Bill O'Neill, American football player
 Richard Phelan (Q '55) was an attorney who served as special counsel for the US House investigation of former Speaker Jim Wright and President of the Cook County Board.
 Dan Savage (QN '82), sex columnist and political pundit, co-founder of the It Gets Better Project, left Quigley in his second year.
 Martin Sandoval (QS '82) was an Illinois State Senator (2003–2020).
 Lawrence Suffredin (QN '65) is an attorney and Cook County Commissioner (2003–present).
 Ed Zotti (aka Cecil Adams) (QN '69) is an editor, columnist and author best known for his column The Straight Dope.

References

External links

 Archbishop Quigley Preparatory Seminary website
 Friends of The Windows at St. James Chapel at Archbishop Quigley Preparatory Seminary website
 YouTube videos of Archbishop Quigley Preparatory Seminary of 2006–2007
 Photos of Quigley May 2007 shortly before its closing
 A Pictorial Tour of Quigley, Spring 2007

Defunct Catholic secondary schools in Illinois
Former high schools in Illinois
Catholic seminaries in the United States
Defunct boys' schools in Illinois
Roman Catholic Archdiocese of Chicago
School buildings on the National Register of Historic Places in Chicago
Educational institutions established in 1905
Educational institutions disestablished in 2007
Gustave E. Steinback buildings
1905 establishments in Illinois